Baal-hazor is a place on the border of Ephraim and Benjamin where Absalom held the feast of sheep-shearing when Amnon was assassinated, according to .

Baal-hazor is identified with Tell Asur, a 1,016 meters high mountain 8 km north-east of Bethel. It is the highest mountain in Samaria and one of the highest mountains in the West Bank.

See also
Hazor (disambiguation)

Hebrew Bible places
Absalom
Books of Samuel